Raúl Muñoz (born 12 October 1915, date of death unknown) was a Chilean sprinter. He competed in the men's 400 metres at the 1936 Summer Olympics.

References

1915 births
Year of death missing
Athletes (track and field) at the 1936 Summer Olympics
Chilean male sprinters
Olympic athletes of Chile
Place of birth missing
20th-century Chilean people